Kadanad  is a Panchayat and Village in Meenachil Taluk of Kottayam district in the Indian state of Kerala.

Location
Kadanad is situated to the north of Palai in Kottayam District. The Panchayat belongs to Lalam Block and Meenachil Taluk in Kottayam District.

Church
There is a Forane church called St.Augustine's Forane Church. The festival of St.Sebastian is conducted every year on January 15 and 16.

Educational Institutions
St. Sebastian's Higher Secondary School is the main educational institution in Kadanad. This educational institution have classes from 5th standard to 12th. A Lower Primary School called St.Mathew's LP School and a Pre-Primary School are also situated in this village.

Other landmarks and details
There is a bridge, a river and a dam in front of the church.
Kadanad Post Office code is 686653 and Telephone code is 04822.
Vehicle Registration is KL 35 (Pala)

Demographics
 India census, Kadanad had a population of 19,739 with 9918 males and 9821 females. Literacy rate men 98.5%, female 96.5%. Population density 598.88/km2

Geography
The place is blessed with mist-covered mountains and valleys. Its peculiar and unique geographical position is well-matched for the cultivation of coffee, rubber, pepper and cardamom. 
Kadanad River is a major water source flowing through this town. It rises from the  Melukavu Hills and joins up with the Ezhachery River. Then it flows in the form of Pala Meenachil River. There is also a place called Valikulam far 1 km from the Kadanad town, there was is a chapel of St. Mary; it is very graceful place in Kadanad.

Culture
Prime attractions are St Augustine's Church, Perumattom Sastha Temple and St. Sebastian's Higher Secondary School. It was the birthplace of Paremmakkal Thoma Kathanar, the author of Varthamanappusthakam (1790), the first-ever travelogue in an Indian language.

Transportation
Kadanad is on the way to Thodupuzha and can be easily approached from Pala. By road, the town is connected with Ramapuram, Uzhavoor,  Meenachil and Erattupetta. The nearest major railhead is Kottayam Railway Station.

References

Villages in Kottayam district